"Rapp Payback (Where Iz Moses)" is a song performed by James Brown. It is a disco reworking of his 1974 song "The Payback". Released as a two-part single on TK Records in 1980, it charted #46 R&B. It also appeared on the album Soul Syndrome.

References

James Brown songs
Songs written by James Brown
1980 singles
1980 songs